"Limbo" is a song by English rock band Royal Blood, and was released on 25 March 2021 as the third single from their third studio album Typhoons.

Composition 
The song has been described as a mixture of the band's hard rock blended with elements of disco and glam rock.

Critical reception 
Joe Divita, writing for Loudwire said of "Limbo" that the song, "subtly discharges a tense, modern rhythm that ebbs with its start-stop/push-pull mentality, while aspects of dance music (electronica, disco) overflow and gradually build in layers.

Music video 
The band released the music video to "Limbo" on 1 April 2021. The music video was directed by Portuguese film director, João Retorta and shot in Kyiv, Ukraine.

Live performances 
The first live performance of the song was on 27 March 2021, where the band gave a virtual performance of the song on the video game, Roblox.

Track listing

Charts

References 

2021 singles
2021 songs
Royal Blood (band) songs